Stratford Point Light is a historic lighthouse in Stratford, Connecticut, 
United States, at the mouth of the Housatonic River. The second tower was one of the first prefabricated cylindrical lighthouses in the country and remains active.

It sits on a  tract at the southeastern tip of Stratford Point.

History

The first Stratford Point Lighthouse was built in 1822. In 1855 a fifth order lens was added to the  wooden tower. The light was automated in 1970 with a modern beacon. It is an active aid to navigation and is used for Coast Guard housing.

The lighthouse was added to the National Register of Historic Places in 1990.

Head keepers
 Samuel Buddington (1822 – 1843)
 William Merwin (1843 – 1844)
 Samuel Buddington (1844 – 1848)
 Amy Buddington (1848 – 1861)
 Rufus Warren Buddington (1861 – 1869)
 Benedict Lillingston (1869 – 1874)
 John L. Brush (1874 – 1879)
 Jerome B. Tuttle (1879 – 1880)
 Theodore Judson (1880 – 1919)
 William F. Petzolt (1919 – 1946)
 Daniel F. McCoart (1946 – 1963)
 Richard L. Fox (1963 – )

See also

 List of lighthouses in Connecticut
 List of lighthouses in the United States
 National Register of Historic Places listings in Fairfield County, Connecticut

References

 "Lights & Legends, A Historical Guide to Lighthouses of Long Island Sound, Fishers Island Sound, and Block Island Sound", Harlan Hamilton, Westcott Publishing Company, 1987.
 "Northeast Lights: Lighthouses and Lightships, Rhode Island to Cape Mary, New Jersey", Robert G. Bachand, Sea Sports Publications, 1989.
 "Lighthouses of Southern New England: Massachusetts, Rhode Island and Connecticut, A Pictorial Guide", Courtney Thompson, CatNap Publications, 2002.

External links

 lighthouse.cc: Stratford Point Light
 lighthousefriends.com: Inventory of Historic Light Stations
 NPS.gov: Stratford Point, CT
 Location on Google Maps
 Stratford Point Lighthouse

Lighthouses completed in 1822
Lighthouses completed in 1881
Buildings and structures in Stratford, Connecticut
Lighthouses in Fairfield County, Connecticut
Lighthouses on the National Register of Historic Places in Connecticut
National Register of Historic Places in Fairfield County, Connecticut
1822 establishments in Connecticut